The Menagerie is an original novel written by Martin Day and based on the long-running British science fiction television series Doctor Who. It features the Second Doctor, Jamie and Zoe.

Plot
The ruling Knights of Kuabris strive to maintain order in the city as horrid creatures emerge from the sewers.  While Jamie languishes in the dungeons, and Zoe is sold into slavery, the Doctor is forced to lead an subterranean expedition for the mythic Menagerie of Ukkazaal. Could the ancient prophecies be coming true?

External links
The Cloister Library - The Menagerie

1995 British novels
1995 science fiction novels
Virgin Missing Adventures
Second Doctor novels
Novels by Martin Day
Fiction set in the 4th millennium